George Whitfield Jr. (born November 23, 1977) is an American former college football and Arena Football League quarterback. He now resides in San Diego, California and is currently running a quarterback training academy Whitfield Athletix.  He was introduced to football by his father, George Whitfield Sr., former collegiate football player at Wichita State in the early 1970s.

High school career
George played for the Massillon Tigers, Massillon, Ohio, football team from 1992 to 1995.

College
In 1996 Whitfield was recruited to play by Jim Tressel, then the head coach of Youngstown State University. During the 1996 season, Whitfield was forced to watch from the sidelines, and as a result, he transferred to Tiffin University to play for Coach Bob Wolfe and the Dragons the following season.  Between 1997 and 2000, Whitfield became Tiffin University's all-time leading passer, with 368 completions for 4391 yards and 39 touchdowns.

Whitfield Athletix
In 2004, he established Whitfield Athletix, a specialized quarterback training academy based out of San Diego, California.

Notable trainees
In 2011, Heisman Trophy winning quarterback and first overall selection Cam Newton began working with George Whitfield Jr. in preparation for the NFL Draft.

In 2012, NFL veteran and free agent Donovan McNabb sought out Whitfield's services to aid in offseason weight loss and to prepare for the upcoming season.

Other trainees
Andrew Luck
Jameis Winston
Johnny Manziel
Bryce Petty
Landry Jones
Tajh Boyd
Taylor Kelly
Braxton Miller
Connor Cook
Logan Thomas
EJ Manuel
Marquise Williams
Charlie Heller
Austin Appleby
Josh Allen

References

External links

 http://www.whitfieldathletix.com

1977 births
Living people
American football quarterbacks
Bossier–Shreveport Battle Wings players
Iowa Hawkeyes football coaches
Chicago Rush players
Louisville Fire players
Memphis Xplorers players
San Diego Chargers coaches
Tiffin Dragons football players
Youngstown State Penguins football players
Sportspeople from Massillon, Ohio
Players of American football from San Diego
Players of American football from Ohio
Players of American football from Wichita, Kansas
African-American coaches of American football
African-American players of American football
Educators from Ohio
21st-century African-American sportspeople
20th-century African-American sportspeople